Mika Aaltonen (born 16 November 1965) is a Finnish former footballer. His position was an attacking central midfielder. He also played for the Finnish national team.

During his career (1982–1994) he played in Finland, Italy, Switzerland, Germany, and Israel for TPS, Internazionale, Bellinzona, Bologna, Hertha BSC, Hapoel Be'er Sheva F.C. and Tampereen Pallo-Veikot. He finished his career at a relatively young age because of a persistent ankle injury, and because of this, he ended up concentrating more on his studies. Aaltonen studied throughout his playing career, and after he retired from football, he earned a doctorate degree in economics.

Aaltonen is best remembered for a goal scored against Italian goalkeeper Walter Zenga in UEFA Cup in 1987 during a match between Turun Palloseura and Inter Milan at the San Siro stadium in Milan. This goal more or less earned him a transfer to Inter shortly afterwards.

References

Sources
 Jalkapallon Pikkujättiläinen (WSOY 2003)

External links

1965 births
Living people
Footballers from Turku
Finnish footballers
Finland international footballers
Turun Palloseura footballers
AC Bellinzona players
Bologna F.C. 1909 players
Hertha BSC players
Hapoel Be'er Sheva F.C. players
Veikkausliiga players
Serie A players
2. Bundesliga players
Liga Leumit players
Finnish expatriate footballers
Expatriate footballers in Italy
Finnish expatriate sportspeople in Italy
Expatriate footballers in Switzerland
Finnish expatriate sportspeople in Switzerland
Expatriate footballers in Germany
Finnish expatriate sportspeople in Germany
Expatriate footballers in Israel
Finnish expatriate sportspeople in Israel
Association football midfielders